The Burg Weiler Altar Triptych (Altarpiece with the Virgin and Child and Saints) or Master of the Burg Weiler Altar is a 1470 religious painting. It is in the collection of the Metropolitan Museum of Art. The altarpiece is Middle Rhenish, made in North Württemberg (now Baden-Württemberg). It was originally in the chapel of the castle of Burg Weiler near Heilbronn.

The triptych is oil on wood of three parts, with a gold ground.

The work depicts Mary, Jesus Christ, Judoc, Wendelin of Trier, Saint Apollonia, Saint Barbara, Catherine of Alexandria, Lawrence of Rome, Saint Sebastian, Saint Maurice, and an angel.

References

Metropolitan Museum of Art 2017 drafts
Paintings in the collection of the Metropolitan Museum of Art
Altarpieces